The 2022–23 season is FC Basel's 129th season in their existence and the club's 28th consecutive season in the top flight of Swiss football since their promotion in the 1993–94 season. The 2022–23 Swiss Super League season starts on the weekend 16 to 17 July 2022 and will end on 29 May 2023. In addition to the Swiss Super League, Basel also participate in this season's edition of the Swiss Cup, starting in the third round. Basel also qualified for the 2nd edition of the UEFA Europa Conference League, beginning play in the second qualifying round.

Club

FC Basel Holding AG
The FC Basel Holding AG owns 75% of FC Basel 1893 AG and the other 25% is owned by the club FC Basel 1893 members. The club FC Basel 1893 functions as a base club independent of the holding company and the AG. FC Basel 1893 AG is responsible for the operational business of the club, e.g. the 1st team, a large part of the youth department and the back office are affiliated there. All decisions that affect the club FC Basel 1893 are made within the AG.

On 20 June 2022 the AGM of the FC Basel Holding AG and the FC Basel 1893 AG were held and the both boards were confirmed. The Holding AG with following members: David Degen (president), Dan Holzmann, Ursula Rey-Krayer and Andreas Rey (vice-president). FC Basel 1893 AG with following members: David Degen (president), Carol Etter (delegate of the club FC Basel), Dan Holzmann, Ursula Rey-Krayer and Andreas Rey (vice-president).

Club management 
The club AGM tool place on 23 May 2022 and the board of directors of the club were all confirmed and are:

Team management 
On 23 May 2022 the club announced that Alexander Frei had been signed a contract that made him head coach of the new FCB first team. On 30 May they announced that Frei had brought his assistant Davide Callà from Winterthur with him. On 10 June the club announced that the coaching staff had been completed and that Martin Andermatt had been signed as assistant coach and Björn Rekelhof had signed as athletics and Gabriel Wüthrich as goalkeeper coach. Wüthrich replaced Massimo Colomba, who had been team goalkeeper from 2009 until 2012 and then became coach.

On 28 November 2022, FCB announced that they had taken Heiko Vogel under contract as their new sporting director, as per 1 January 2023.

On 7 February 2023, it was announced that Frei had been removed from his position as head coach and that sporting director Heiko Vogel would take over his duties ad interim.

Overview

Off and pre-season
During the off-season a number of players left the team. The loan contracts of 5 youngsters came to an end, these being Gonçalo Cardoso, Sebastiano Esposito, Tomás Tavares, Albian Hajdari and Joelson Fernandes and they returned to their clubs of origin. The contracts with Pajtim Kasami and Andrea Padula were not renewed. Raoul Petretta decided himself not to renew his contract and he became free agent. Petretta had started his youth football with Basel in 2005. He played in all their U-teams and advanced to their first team in 2017. Here, between the years 2017 and 2022 Petretta played a total of 199 games for Basel scoring a total of 11 goals. 109 of these games were in the Nationalliga A, 13 in the Swiss Cup, 30 in the UEFA competitions (Champions League, Europa League and Conference League and 47 were friendly games. He scored 7 goals in the domestic league, 1 in the Cup, 2 in Europa and the other was scored during the test games.

Valentin Stocker ended his active career. During his time with the club Stocker won the Swiss championship six times and the Swiss Cup four times. Between the years 2007 and 2014 and again from 2018 to 2022 he played a total of 515 games for Basel scoring a total of 116 goals. 286 of these games were in the Swiss Super League, 33 in the Swiss Cup, 57 in the UEFA competitions (Champions League, Europa League and Conference League and 99 were friendly games. He scored 74 goal in the domestic league, 9 in the Cup and 18 in the European competitions, the other 15 were scored during the test games.

In the other direction, on 20 May FCB announced that the ex-international goalkeeper Marwin Hitz had signed in from Borussia Dortmund on a three year contract. Another player who signed in from BVB was Bradley Fink. The youngster had played for their reserve team and he signed in on a four year contract. Four players came in on loan contracts. Two for Basel interesting loan signings were the Swiss international players Zeki Amdouni from Lausanne-Sport and Andi Zeqiri from Brighton and Hove Albion. The other two were Kasim Nuhu from Hoffenheim and Andy Diouf from Rennes On 18 June FCB announced that they had signed Jean-Kévin Augustin| from FC Nantes in a three year deal.

The team had five pre-season test games, two of which were against Xamax and these were both played in the Youth Campus Basel. The first was won the second was drawn. Two games were played in the training camp, against SpVgg Greuther Fürth and Botoșani and both were won. One game was played in St. Jakob-Park, against Hamburger SV, and this ended with a high defeat. Because the new head coach Alexander Frei changed the formation in each game, mostly substituting all 11 players during the break, all players received playing time, but to the spectators, it seemed that the team hadn't found their form.

The Campaign

Domestic League

Domestic Cup

Europa Conference League

Players

First-team squad 
The following is the list of the Basel first team squad. It also includes players that were in the squad the day the season started on 16 July 2022, but subsequently left the club after that date.

Players out on loan

Transfers summer 2022 
In

Out

Results and fixtures 
Kickoff times are in CET.

Legend

Friendly matches

Pre-season

Mid-season

Winter break

Swiss Super League 

The league fixtures were announced on 17 June 2022.

First half of season

Second half of season

Swiss Cup 

The matches of the first round were drawn on 5 July 2022 and took place between 19 and 21 August 2022. Home advantage was granted to the team from the lower league

UEFA Europa Conference League

Second qualifying round 
The draw for the second qualifying round was made on 15 June 2022.

Basel won 3–1 on aggregate.

Third qualifying round 

2–2 on aggregate. Basel won 3–1 on penalties.

Play-off round 

Basel won 2–1 on aggregate.

Group stage

Group table

Knockout round play-offs

Basel won 2–1 on aggregate.

Round of 16

See also
 History of FC Basel
 List of FC Basel players
 List of FC Basel seasons

Notes

References

Sources
 FCB squad 2022–23 at fcb-archiv.ch
 Switzerland 2022–22 at RSSSF

External links
 
 Homepage Verein "Basler Fussballarchiv" 

FC Basel seasons
Basel
Basel